Pushing the Salmanilla Envelope is an album by the American band Jimmie's Chicken Shack. It was released in 1997. The album sold more than 200,000 copies. The band supported the album by opening for Everclear on a North American tour.

The title is a word play of "Pushing the envelope", salmonella, and manila envelope.

Critical reception
The Washington Post wrote that the band "combines art-rock and hard-rock with a muscular rhythm section that adds a surging, funk-flavored bottom in the vein of the Red Hot Chili Peppers and Living Colour."

Track listing
All tracks by Jimi Haha, Jim McD, Jim Chaney & Che Lemon
 Dropping Anchor - 3:40
 Outhouse - 3:20
 High - 3:48
 Spiderweb - 4:05
 Blood - 3:44
 This Is Not Hell - 5:07
 Milk - 5:21
 Hole - 2:21
 School Bus - 2:55
 Another Day - 3:24
 Sitting with the Dog - 4:10
 When You Die You're Dead - 3:16

Personnel 
Jimi Haha - Guitar/Vocals
Jim McD - Guitar
Jim Chaney - Drums and Percussion
Che Lemon - Bass

References

Jimmie's Chicken Shack albums
1997 albums
The Rocket Record Company albums